This article lists the Ministers of State in the Duchy of Brunswick from 1843 to 1918 and Ministers-President or equivalent office of the Free State of Brunswick from 1918 to 1946.

Ministers of State of the Duchy of Brunswick
1843–1848: Werner Graf von Ventheim
1848: Johann Georg Christian von Koch
1848–1856: Wilhelm Johann Karl Heinrich Freiherr von Schleinitz
1856–1861: August von Geyso
1861–1874: Asche Burckhard Carl Ferdinand von Campe
1874–1883: Johann Christian Wilhelm Schulz
1883–1889: Wilhelm Otto Hans Görtz-Wrisberg
1889–1911: Albert von Otto
1911–1914: Leonhard Christoph Adolf von Hartwieg
1914–1918: Karl Wolff

Ministers-President of the Free State of Brunswick
Political Party:

See also
Minister President of Lower Saxony

External links
Worldstatesmen.org – Duchy of Brunswick and Free State of Brunswick

Ministers-President
Brunswick
Ministers-President of Brunswick